Master Service Station, also known as Bennett's Tire & Battery Co., is a historic building located in Waterloo, Iowa, United States. This was one of the first "super service stations" built in the city. Developed in California in the early 1920s, they combined a filling station with other auto-related services. The first one was built in Waterloo in 1928, and this was one of three that opened in 1930. Located on a corner lot, it is a single-story structure that follows an L-shaped plan. The building exhibits both Art Deco (piers) and Spanish Colonial Revival (tower and tile roof). Its original owner, Homer L. Lichty, lost the business to bankruptcy in 1932. The station was acquired by John G. Miller, who constructed the building. Miller sold the station in 1934. Bennett's Tire & Brake Co., a Waterloo Goodyear tire dealer, moved in sometime after that and remained until 1960. The Waterloo Convention & Visitors Bureau is now located in the building. It was listed on the National Register of Historic Places in 2011.

References

Commercial buildings completed in 1930
Buildings and structures in Waterloo, Iowa
National Register of Historic Places in Black Hawk County, Iowa
Gas stations on the National Register of Historic Places in Iowa
Spanish Colonial Revival architecture in Iowa
Art Deco architecture in Iowa